Anode break excitation (ABE) is an electrophysiological phenomenon whereby a neuron fires action potentials in response to termination of a hyperpolarizing current.

When a hyperpolarizing current is applied across a membrane, the electrical potential across the membrane falls (becomes negative of the resting potential); this fall is followed by a drop in the threshold required for action potential (since the threshold is directly linked to the potential across the membrane - they rise and fall together).

ABE arises after the hyperpolarizing current is terminated: the potential across the cell rises rapidly with the absence of hyperpolarizing stimulus, but the action potential threshold stays at its lowered value. As a result, the potential is suprathreshold: sufficient to cause an action potential within the cell.

Further reading

External links 
A description of anode break excitation.

See also
 Action potential
 Hodgkin–Huxley model
 Neural accommodation

Electrophysiology